Eduardo Víctor Haedo  (Mercedes, Soriano, July 28, 1901 – November 15, 1970) was a Uruguayan political figure.

Background 

Haedo was a prominent member of the Uruguayan National Party. He served as Education Minister from 1936 to 1938 under President Gabriel Terra.

President of Uruguay 

He was President of the National Council of Government 1961–1962, succeeding his National Party colleague Benito Nardone.

Post Presidency 

Haedo was succeeded as President in 1962 by Faustino Harrison, also of the Uruguayan National Party.

He died in 1970.

References
 :es:Eduardo Víctor Haedo

See also 

 Politics of Uruguay

1901 births
1970 deaths
People from Mercedes, Uruguay
National Party (Uruguay) politicians
Presidents of the National Council of Government (Uruguay)
Education and Culture Ministers of Uruguay
Ministers of Labor and Social Affairs of Uruguay